James Lewis (August 29, 1854 – May 23, 1929) was a Canadian politician. He served in the Legislative Assembly of New Brunswick as member of the Conservative party representing Saint John City from 1925 to 1929.

References

1854 births
1929 deaths
20th-century Canadian politicians
Politicians from Saint John, New Brunswick
Progressive Conservative Party of New Brunswick MLAs